The California Department of Consumer Affairs (DCA) is a department within the California Business, Consumer Services, and Housing Agency. DCA's stated mission is to serve the interests of California's consumers by ensuring a standard of professionalism in key industries and promoting informed consumer practices. The DCA provides the public with information on safe consumer practices, in an effort to protect the public from unscrupulous or unqualified people who promote deceptive products or services.

DCA licenses or certifies practitioners in more than 255 professions. There are currently more than 2.4 million practitioners licensed by the DCA. The department consists of more than 40 bureaus, boards, committees, commission, and other entities that license and regulate practitioners. Regulatory duties include investigating complaints against licensees and disciplining violators. Boards, committees, and commissions operate independently but rely on DCA for administrative support. Fees paid by these licensees fund DCA operations almost exclusively. Bureaus, programs, divisions, and offices are under the full control of DCA.

List of bureaus, boards, and commissions 
 California Board of Chiropractic Examiners
 California Athletic Commission
 California Board of Accountancy
 California Board of Acupuncture
 California Architects Board
 California Board for Professional Engineers, Land Surveyors, and Geologists
 California Board of Barbering and Cosmetology
 California Board of Behavioral Sciences
 California Bureau of Electronic and Appliance Repair, Home Furnishings and Thermal Insulation
 California Board of Guide Dogs for the Blind
 California Board of Optometry
 California Board of Pharmacy
 California Board of Vocational Nursing and Psychiatric Technicians
 California Bureau of Automotive Repair
 California Bureau of Marijuana Control, formerly the Bureau of Medical Marijuana Regulation
 California Bureau of Naturopathic Medicine
 California Bureau for Private Postsecondary Education
 California Bureau of Real Estate (now an independent departement)
 California Bureau of Real Estate Appraisers
 California Bureau of Security and Investigative Services
 California Cemetery and Funeral Bureau
 California Complaint Resolution Program
 California Contractors State License Board
 California Court Reporters Board
 California Dental Board
 California Dental Hygiene Committee
 California Hearing Aid Dispensers Bureau
 California Landscape Architects Technical Committee
 Medical Board of California
 Osteopathic Medical Board of California

Consumer support

DCA provides the public with live telephone assistance in more than 170 languages for consumer-related questions and concerns. The department publishes a number of publications on consumer-related issues, the most popular being the California Tenants Guide. Publications are free to the public and are made available on the department's website.

DCA's enforcement staff works with the Office of the Attorney General of California and local district attorneys to investigate fraudulent activity in the marketplace. Many investigations are initiated as a result of complaints from consumers.

DCA has a Complaint Resolution Program to help resolve disputes between consumers and businesses.

History

Consumer protection in California began with the passage of the Medical Practice Act of 1876. The Act was designed to regulate the State's medical professionals, who up to that point had operated virtually unchecked. However, an actual government agency with the legal authority to enforce the Act was not created until 1878. The three boards created that year were later consolidated into what is now the Medical Board of California. Additional professions and vocations were brought under State authority in the next 30 years. By the late 1920s, the Department of Vocational and Professional Standards was responsible for licensing or certifying accountants, barbers, cosmetologists, dentists, embalmers, optometrists, pharmacists, physicians, and veterinarians. The Consumer Affairs Act was passed in 1970, giving the department its current name.

Administration 
DCA's boards, bureaus, and other entities are supported by a dedicated and highly skilled staff of legal, technical, and administrative professionals. These professionals provide a wide range of support services including human resources, information technology, investigations, professional examinations, training, strategic planning, budgeting, and more.

The Office of Administrative Services provides accounting, business, personnel, and budget services. It consists of Business Services, Human Resources, and Fiscal Operations. Business Services ensures that DCA entities promote sound business decisions and practices in contracting and purchasing goods and services. It also manages DCA's many facilities, vehicle fleet, emergency response, and its mailroom, copying, and imaging services. Human Resources provides human resources support for DCA employees. Fiscal Operations provides budget, accounting, and central cashiering services.

The Office of Information Services directs and manages information technology for all of DCA. It consists of Applications Services, Enterprise Technology Services, Infrastructure Services, Client Services, Enterprise Project Services, and the Information Security Office. Application Services maintains the Consumer Affairs System and the Applicant Tracking System databases that form the core of DCA's business processes. Enterprise Technology maintains and supports DCA's UNIX/Wide Area Network as well as the Internet and intranet sites, and maintains the enterprise architecture. Infrastructure Services maintains the desktop and network services, and phone services. Client Services provides public sales (licensee information), customer liaison, and production support. It includes the Family Support Unit, which maintains systems that involve processing limited license hold issues related to child support systems, and the Service Desk. Enterprise Project Services provides project management assistance, control agency liaison services, oversees the OIS change management and release process, manages the BreEZe project that will replace the DCA legacy systems, and is implementing IT Governance. The Information Security Office establishes the IT security and data privacy policies, maintains the business continuity planning process, investigates IT security breaches, and acts as liaison to the State Information Technology Agency in matters related to the IT security of DCA.

The Complaint Resolution Program helps resolve complaints that consumers have filed after experiencing difficulty or disappointment in the California marketplace.

The Consumer information Center is DCA's information resource center for consumers and licensees. Through its Call Center and Correspondence Unit, CIC provides consumers and licensees with user-friendly information and identifies for them the government agency or community organization that can best address their needs. CIC phone agents answer calls from consumers to DCA's toll-free number. Correspondence Unit staff respond to e-mails and letters sent to the department.

The Equal Employment Opportunity Office promotes equal employment opportunity at DCA. The EEO Office also promotes affirmative action for people with disabilities and works to prevent and eliminate discriminatory practices through policy implementation, training, education, and outreach.

The Division of Investigation is the law enforcement and investigative branch of DCA. It is the only entity within DCA that employs investigators who are designated peace officers. DOI staff work to provide timely, objective, and cost-effective investigations regarding allegations of misconduct by licensees of client agencies, and to developing information for filing criminal, administrative, and civil actions on behalf of these agencies. DOI field investigations frequently involve allegations of the illegal use and theft of drugs, sexual misconduct, quality-of-care issues, and unlicensed activity. Within the DOI is the Special Operations Unit which is responsible for workplace security and employee safety at DCA.

The Legal Division includes the Legal Office, the Legal Services Unit, and the Administrative Unit. These units provide legal services to the Department's Executive staff and to all DCA entities. The Legal Office serves as in-house counsel for the director as well as the boards, bureaus, programs, and other entities of DCA. Legal Office lawyers provide legal analysis and opinions on laws, issues, proposed legislation, government contracts, employer-employee matters, the Open Meetings Act, the Public Records Act, and the Information Practices Act. The Legal Services Unit counsels the director in carrying out the consumer mandates of the Consumer Affairs Act. This unit created and maintains several consumer handbooks and guides, including California Tenants: A Guide to Residential Tenants’ and Landlords’ Rights and Responsibilities; The Small Claims Court: A Guide to Its Practical Use; and more than 30 consumer-oriented legal guides. The Administrative Unit provides in-house counsel to the department's administrative divisions and Division of Investigation and represents DCA before the State Personnel Board and the Department of Personnel Administration.

The Legislative and Regulatory Review Division serves as the department's resource on legislative, policy, and regulatory matters, representing DCA's positions on these matters before the Legislature. The Division monitors and analyzes legislative bills on consumer issues, reviews proposed regulation packages, and provides substantive policy consultation and review on myriad issues throughout DCA and its entities. Division staff also advise the director on public policy affecting consumers, as well as on any proposed regulations that impact the health, safety, and welfare of Californians. Division staff attend all board and bureau meetings to identify, analyze, and monitor policy issues, as well as other matters of interest.

The Office of Professional Examination Services provides psychometric consulting services for the management of occupational licensure examination programs. OPES’ services include occupational analysis, item writing, examination development, standard setting, program evaluation, and statistical analysis of examination performance. OPES follows the highest technical and professional standards in the industry to ensure that licensing examinations are valid, job-related, and legally defensible. In addition to servicing 30—40 interagency contracts with DCA boards, bureaus, and committees, OPES also oversees the master contract for examination administration at computer-based testing centers throughout the State. In June 2013, OPES implemented a new master contract with PSI Services LLC, resulting in cost savings of 10 percent for its clients that use the contract.

The Office of Public Affairs creates and executes strategic media and communications plans for DCA, proactively provides news media with information of interest to consumers, and responds to media inquiries. OPA alerts media to unlicensed activity sweeps.

The Office of Publications, Design & Editing designs, edits, updates, and distributes more than 200 consumer publications, newsletters, and reports produced by DCA's various entities and by its Executive Office. PDE supports DCA's licensees by producing and publishing online newsletters for many of its boards and bureaus, and supports DCA staff by producing Did You Know?, the monthly online newsletter for employees. PDE staff also write, edit, design, and distribute DCA's award-winning quarterly consumer magazine, Consumer Connection.

Solid Training Solutions supports the development of all DCA employees through the design, delivery, evaluation, and administration of training and education programs. Its mission is to develop and manage a centralized program for training, education, and human resources development which ensures a skilled workforce that can meet DCA's strategic objectives. In addition, Solid offers strategic planning assistance, process improvement, and more.

References 

 Department of Consumer Affairs in the 2010-2011 budget

External links 
 California Department of Consumer Affairs
 Title 16 Professional and Vocational Regulations of the California Code of Regulations from Westlaw

Consumer Affairs, California Department of
Consumer rights agencies